Trifolium oliganthum is a species of clover known by the common name fewflower clover. It is native to western coastal and montane North America from British Columbia to California, the Sierra Nevada, and to Baja California, where it occurs in many types of habitat.

Description
Trifolium oliganthum is an annual herb growing upright in form. The leaves are made up of variously shaped leaflets measuring 1 to 2 centimeters in length, and toothed stipules. The inflorescence is a head of flowers no more than a centimeter wide. At its base is a fused involucre of bracts. Each flower has a calyx of sepals which may have a forked tip. The flower corolla is under a centimeter in length.

References

External links
Jepson Manual Treatment - Trifolium oliganthum
Washington Burke Museum
Trifolium oliganthum - Photo gallery

oliganthum
Flora of the West Coast of the United States
Flora of British Columbia
Flora of Baja California
Flora of California
Flora of the Sierra Nevada (United States)
Natural history of the California chaparral and woodlands
Flora without expected TNC conservation status